The  Malaysia women's national ice hockey team is the ice hockey team representing Malaysia internationally in women's competition. The team is overseen by the Malaysia Ice Hockey Federation, a member of the International Ice Hockey Federation. The team was formed in 2016 and currently competes in the IIHF Women's Challenge Cup of Asia Division I tournament.

History
The Malaysia women's national ice hockey team played its first game in March 2016 at the 2016 IIHF Women's Challenge Cup of Asia Division I tournament. The team lost their first two games of the tournament, losing to Thailand 2–14 and Chinese Taipei 0–21. Their game against Chinese Taipei is currently their largest international loss. Malaysia recorded their first win in their third game of the tournament after they defeated India 6–3. The team lost their final game of the tournament against Singapore, finishing fourth in the standings.

International competitions
2016 IIHF Women's Challenge Cup of Asia Division I. Finish: 4th (4th overall)
2017 IIHF Women's Challenge Cup of Asia. Finish: 7th
2018 IIHF Women's Challenge Cup of Asia Division I. Finish: 1st (5th overall)
2019 IIHF Women's Challenge Cup of Asia. Finish: 5th

Players and personnel

Team roster
For the 2016 IIHF Women's Challenge Cup of Asia Division I

Team staff
For the 2016 IIHF Women's Challenge Cup of Asia Division I
Head coach: Nikolas Sepponen
General manager: Ee Laine Chee
Team leader: Nurhidayah Badaruddin
Team staff: Haniff Mahmood
Equipment manager: Mohd Hafis Anjam
Physiotherapist: Nurdiasafra Hassan

References

External links
Malaysia Ice Hockey Federation

Ice hockey in Malaysia
I
Women's national ice hockey teams in Asia